Felix Angel Solis (born September 17, 1971) is an American actor, film director, and film producer. Born on the Upper West Side and raised in Chelsea/Greenwich Village area of New York City, to parents that were both born in Puerto Rico, Felix considers himself a Nuyorican.

Career
Solis first started working on shows set in NYC such as New York Undercover, NYPD Blue, Third Watch and the film Empire (starring opposite John Leguizamo and Peter Sarsgaard). He then appeared in acclaimed television shows such as The West Wing, OZ, Law & Order: SVU, The Sopranos, Law & Order: Criminal Intent, Damages and Fringe, and Ozark; and numerous films such as The Forgotten (opposite Julianne Moore), Wes Craven's My Soul to Take, Man on a Ledge (opposite Sam Worthington and Ed Harris), and Arbitrage (opposite Tim Roth).

With his roots in theatre, Felix has also continued to work on stage receiving the HOLA 2013 Award for Outstanding Performance by a Male Actor for the production of Basilica at New York's prestigious Cherry Lane Theatre; a Connecticut Critics Circle Award in 2008 for Boleros for the Disenchanted and a Helen Hayes Award nomination for Outstanding Lead Actor in a Passion Play in 2006. As a stage director, Solis helmed Raúl Castillo's Knives and Other Sharp Objects at the Joseph Papp Public Theater in 2009.

Solis has originated parts in In Arabia We'd All Be Kings and Our Lady of 121st Street, both written by Stephen Adly Guirgis with direction by Philip Seymour Hoffman. He performed at the Cherry Lane Theater's stage in Havana Is Waiting by Eduardo Machado. Solis has also been a member of The Actors Studio since 2001, where he has appeared in plays including Salome starring Dianne Wiest and Al Pacino.

Al Pacino wrote him to thank him for his performance in the original production of Our Lady Of 121st Street with the LAByrinth Theater Company, of which he has been a member since 1999.

Solis has appeared in over 18 films including The Forgotten, Taking Chance, The International, My Soul to Take, and Gun Hill Road (winner of the 2011 Grand Jury Nominee at the Sundance Film Festival). Solis' television appearances include The Following, The Good Wife, Made in Jersey, NYC 22, Weekends at Bellevue, Criminal Minds, Army Wives, ATF-The Line, Damages, Fringe, The Sopranos, Oz, The West Wing, Third Watch, NYPD Blue, New York Undercover, and Blue Bloods.

In 2013 Solis co-created a film production company called Subway Token Films with his partner, actress Liza Fernandez. Their first short film, Tinto, shot on location in the Maipo Valley wine region of Chile, South America, premiered at the Tribeca Film Festival in 2014, getting nominated for Best Short Narrative. It also screened at the Shnit Worldwide Short Film Festival in 2015. Their next short film, iHeart (which Solis directed), made its world premiere at the Hoboken International Film Festival; it won the Award of Merit at One-Reeler Short Film Competition, and continues its way through the festival circuit. His next short film, Going Down, was shot in Los Angeles in June and is in post-production. He is an active volunteer at the 52nd Street Project, a non-profit group that matches inner-city kids with professional theatre artists to introduce them to the business and craft of theatre production. He is also a supporter of the ASPCA and WSPA.

Solis had a recurring role on The Following. He was a regular on the CBS TV series Made in Jersey starring Kyle MacLachlan, and Janet Montgomery. On the same network he played Sgt. Terry Howard on NYC 22, produced by Jane Rosenthal and Robert De Niro, as well as a recurring role on The Good Wife as the "No-Nonsense" Det. Kevin Rodriguez. Solis also landed a role on USA’s Colony playing Geronimo, and ABC’s The Family playing Editor-in-Chief Gus Flores. Felix was recently cast in the series regular in ABC's Ten Days in the Valley as Commander Gomez that premiered in October 2017.

Filmography

Film

Television

Videogame

References

External links

1971 births
Living people
American male film actors
American people of Puerto Rican descent
Hispanic and Latino American male actors
Male actors from New York City